Luis García or Luis Garcia may refer to:

Sports
Luis García (basketball) (born 1941), Uruguayan basketball player
Luis García (fencer) (born 1934), Venezuelan fencer
Luis-Augusto García (born in the 1900s), Mexican tennis player
Luis García (weightlifter) (born 1995), Dominican weightlifter
Luis Alberto García (born 1980), Venezuelan taekwondo practitioner

Athletics
Luis Fernando García (born 1974), Guatemalan race walker
Luis García (Cuban racewalker), Cuban athlete and medalist at the 1999 Central American and Caribbean Championships in Athletics
Luis García (hammer thrower), Mexican hammer thrower and medalist at the 2004 NACAC U23 Championships in Athletics
Luis Garcia (Paralympic athlete), competitor in Athletics at the 1992 Summer Paralympics – Men's 100 metres B1
Luis García (runner), Spanish distance runner and winner at the Spanish Cross Country Championships
Luis García (shot putter), Ecuadorian shot putter and medalist in athletics at the 1993 Bolivarian Games
Luis García (sprinter), Venezuelan sprinter and medalist at the 1982 Pan American Junior Athletics Championships
Luis García (Venezuelan racewalker), Venezuelan athlete competing in 50 km walk and medalist in athletics at the 1994 South American Games

Baseball players
Luis García (first baseman) (born 1978), Mexican baseball player
Luis García (outfielder) (born 1975), Mexican baseball player
Luis García (pitcher, born 1987), Dominican baseball player
Luis García (pitcher, born 1996), Venezuelan baseball player
Luis García (shortstop) (born 1975), Dominican baseball player
Luis García (third baseman) (1929–2014), Venezuelan baseball player
Luis García (infielder, born 2000), American baseball player
Luis J. García (infielder), baseball infielder

Footballers
Luis García (Chilean footballer), Chilean international footballer in 1917
Luis García (footballer, born 1964), Mexican football manager and former defender
Luis García (footballer, born 1969), Mexican footballer, played for Mexico and various clubs, now a commentator
Luis García (footballer, born 1972), Spanish football coach
Luis Tevenet (born Luis García Tevenet, 1974), former Spanish football forward
Luis García (footballer, born 1978), Spanish football midfielder
Luis García (footballer, born 1979), Spanish football goalkeeper
Luis García (footballer, born 1981), Spanish football striker
Luis Ángel García (born 1984), Mexican football midfielder, mostly played for Veracruz and Querétaro
Luis Francisco García (born 1987), Mexican footballer, mostly played for Necaxa
Luis García (footballer, born 1988), Peruvian footballer, has mostly played for Unión Comercio, Deportivo Municipal and Melgar
Luis García (footballer, born 1992), Mexican football goalkeeper, has mostly played for Toluca on loan from Querétaro 
Luis García (footballer, born March 1993), Mexican football forward
Luis García (footballer, born September 1993), Ecuadorian football striker
Luis García (footballer, born 1994), Mexican football defender
Luis García (footballer, born 1995), Mexican football midfielder
Luis García (football manager) (born 1988), Argentine football manager

Politicians
Luis Roberto García, Colombian politician and Governor of the Department of Cesar
Luis García Meza (1929–2018), president of Bolivia
Luis Garcia (politician) (born 1945), Miami politician

Others
Luis Armand Garcia (born 1992), American actor
Luis García Berlanga (1921–2010), Spanish film director and screenwriter
Luis García Mozos (born 1946), Spanish comic book artist
Fernando Luis García (1929–1952), member of United States Marine Corps, first Puerto Rican awarded with the Medal of Honor